The Namibia Transport and Allied Workers Union (NATAU) is a trade union in Namibia. It was founded in June 1989. NATAU is an affiliate of the National Union of Namibian Workers (NUNW) and the International Transport Workers' Federation.

References

International Transport Workers' Federation
Trade unions established in 1989
Trade unions in Namibia